Most African sculpture was historically in wood and other organic materials that have not survived from earlier than at most a few centuries ago; older pottery figures are found from a number of areas. Masks are important elements in the art of many peoples, along with human figures, often highly stylized.  There is a vast variety of styles, often varying within the same context of origin depending on the use of the object, but wide regional trends are apparent; sculpture is most common among "groups of settled cultivators in the areas drained by the Niger and Congo rivers" in West Africa.  Direct images of African deities are relatively infrequent, but masks in particular are or were often made for traditional African religious ceremonies; today many are made for tourists as "airport art".  African masks were an influence on European Modernist art, which was inspired by their lack of concern for naturalistic depiction.

By region

The Nubian Kingdom of Kush in modern Sudan was in close and often hostile contact with Egypt, and produced monumental sculpture mostly derivative of styles to the north.  In West Africa, the earliest known sculptures are from the Nok culture which thrived between 500 BC and 500 AD in modern Nigeria, with clay figures typically with elongated bodies and angular shapes. Later West African cultures developed bronze casting for reliefs to decorate palaces like the famous Benin Bronzes, and very fine naturalistic royal heads from around the Yoruba town of Ife in terracotta and metal from the 12th to the 14th centuries. Akan goldweights are a form of small metal sculptures produced over the period 1400–1900, some apparently representing proverbs and so with a narrative element rare in African sculpture, and royal regalia included impressive gold sculptured elements.

Many West African figures are used in religious rituals and are often coated with materials placed on them for ceremonial offerings.  The Mande-speaking peoples of the same region make pieces of wood with broad, flat surfaces and arms and legs are shaped like cylinders.  In Central Africa, however, the main distinguishing characteristics include heart-shaped faces that are curved inward and display patterns of circles and dots.

Eastern Africans are not known for their sculpture, but one style from the region is pole sculptures, carved in human shapes and decorated with geometric forms, while the tops are carved with figures of animals, people, and various objects. These poles are then placed next to graves and are associated with death and the ancestral world.  The culture known from Great Zimbabwe left more impressive buildings than sculpture but the eight soapstone Zimbabwe Birds appear to have had a special significance and were mounted on monoliths.  Modern Zimbabwean sculptors in soapstone have achieved considerable international success.  Southern Africa's oldest known clay figures date from 400 to 600 AD and have cylindrical heads with a mixture of human and animal features.

See also

 African art
 African traditional masks
 Tribal art

Notes

References
 Hugh Honour and John Fleming, A World History of Art, 1st ed. 1982 (many later editions), Macmillan, London, page refs to 1984 Macmillan 1st ed. paperback.

Further reading

External links
"African Votive Sculptures". Herbert E. Roese
Sculpture of Nigeria and Cameroon